Gompholobium subulatum is a species of flowering plant in the pea family Fabaceae and is endemic to northern Australia. It is a slender, erect shrub with pinnate leaves with five to eleven leaflets, and uniformly yellow, pea-like flowers.

Description

Taxonomy
Gompholobium subulatum was first formally described in 1837 by George Bentham in Commentationes de Leguminosarum Generibus. The specific epithet (subulatum) means "awl-shaped", referring to the leaflets.

Distribution and habitat
This species of pea grows on rocky outcrops in the Central Kimberley, Northern Kimberley and Victoria Bonaparte biogeographic regions of Western Australia and the Northern Territory.

Conservation status
Gompholobium subulatum is classified as "not threatened" by the Government of Western Australia Department of Biodiversity, Conservation and Attractions.

References

Mirbelioids
subulatum
Fabales of Australia
Flora of Western Australia
Flora of the Northern Territory
Plants described in 1837
Taxa named by George Bentham